Siphateles is a genus of fish belonging to the family Cyprinidae, native to the Western United States. They were formerly placed in the genus Gila.

Species
The species include:
Siphateles alvordensis C. L. Hubbs & R. R. Miller, 1972 (Alvord chub)
 Siphateles bicolor (Girard, 1856) (Tui chub)
 Siphateles bicolor bicolor (Girard, 1856) (Tui chub)
 Siphateles bicolor isolata C. L. Hubbs & R. R. Miller, 1972 (Independence Valley tui chub)
 Siphateles bicolor mohavensis (Snyder, 1918) (Mohave tui chub)
 Siphateles bicolor obesa (Girard, 1856)
 Siphateles bicolor pectinifer (Snyder, 1917)
 Siphateles bicolor snyderi R. R. Miller, 1973 (Owens tui chub)
 Siphateles bicolor vaccaceps F. T. Bills & C. E. Bond, 1980 
 Siphateles boraxobius J. E. Williams & C. E. Bond, 1980 (Borax Lake chub)

References

 
Chubs (fish)
Ray-finned fish genera
Endemic fauna of the United States
Freshwater fish of the United States
Taxa named by Edward Drinker Cope